Colin Moock is an Adobe Flash and ActionScript expert. He is an author, tutor, and programmer.

Career
Moock studied at the Literature Department of the University of Waterloo, Canada.
Colin worked as a webmaster for SoftQuad, Inc. (until 1997). For the next four years, he worked at the Canadian interactive Agency ICE, Inc.  Moock has developed interactive applications for Sony, HP, Procter & Gamble and other brands.

Multiuser era
Moock is also an advocate of the multiuser technology applications (what he called 'the Multiuser Era'). He is one of the creators of the Union project — a development platform for such applications.

Bibliography
Moock has written several books about Flash and ActionScript, some of the ones became the bestsellers. His works are translated into many languages (inсluding French, German, Russian).
 2001. ActionScript: The Definitive Guide. O'Reilly.
 2002. ActionScript for Flash MX: The Definitive Guide. O'Reilly.
 2003. ActionScript for Flash MX Pocket Reference. O'Reilly.
 2004. Essential ActionScript 2.0. O'Reilly.
 2007. Essential ActionScript 3.0. O'Reilly.

References

External links
 moock.org — official site;
 lectures — lectures by Moock;

Canadian computer programmers
Living people
Canadian technology writers
University of Waterloo alumni
Year of birth missing (living people)